Pamela Marshall may refer to:

Pam Marshall (born 1960), American athlete
Pamela J. Marshall (born 1954), American horn player and composer
Pamela Marshall (archaeologist), British archaeologist and historian specialising in the study of castles